The 1973–74 season was Cambridge United's 4th season in the Football League.

After gaining promotion to the Third Division last season, Cambridge struggled to adapt to the tougher challenge and were relegated back to the Fourth Division.

Final league table

Results

Legend

Football League Third Division

FA Cup

League Cup

Squad statistics

References
 Cambridge 1973–74 at statto.com 
 Player information sourced from The English National Football Archive

Cambridge United F.C. seasons
Cambridge United